Schaub is a German surname. Notable people with the surname include:

Bernhard Schaub (born 1954), Swiss holocaust denier
Brendan Schaub (born 1983), American professional mixed martial artist
Buddy Schaub (21st century), American punk rock trombonist
Christoph Schaub (born 1958), Swiss film director and screenwriter
David Schaub, special effects artist
Diana Schaub, American philosopher
Emelia Christine Schaub (1891–1995), American lawyer, Michigan's first elected woman prosecutor
Fred Schaub (1960–2003), German football (soccer) player
Frédéric Schaub (born 1987), Swiss football defender
Jeffrey Schaub, American TV news anchor and reporter
Julius Schaub (1898–1967), the chief aide and adjutant of Adolf Hitler
Konrad Schaub, Canadian ice dancer
Louis Schaub (born 1994), Austrian footballer
Sir Luke Schaub (1690–1758), British diplomat
Marc Schaub (born 1992), German professional ice hockey player
Matt Schaub (born 1981), American football quarterback
Sarah Schaub (born 1983), American actress
Stefan Schaub (born 1952), German music teacher and scholar
William F. Schaub (c.1900–1999), United States Assistant Secretary of the Army

See also
Schoff
Schoof
Shoaf

German-language surnames